Hoi King Sports Association is a Hong Kong football club which currently competes in the Hong Kong First Division.

History
Founded in 2015, the club's name is derived from its founders Fung Hoi Man and Lo King Yau. Since its beginnings, the club has recruited students from the Diocesan Boys' School to form the core of its squad.

The club's first official match occurred on 6 September 2015 against fellow Hong Kong Third Division side, Sun International. The match resulted in a 2–1 debut victory for Hoi King. During the last match of the season on 22 May 2016, Hoi King managed a draw against Central & Western, ensuring that Hoi King would own the tiebreaker between the two clubs based on head-to-head results. This result allowed Hoi King to clinch the Third Division title in their maiden season.

During the 2016–17 season, the club finished level with Central & Western on points, but once again won the head-to-head tiebreaker. As a result, Hoi King finished as runners up in the Hong Kong Second Division and clinched their second successive promotion in as many years.

In April 2018, the club applied for promotion to the Hong Kong Premier League. On 24 May, despite an 8th-place finish in the First Division, the Hong Kong Football Association accepted Hoi King's application to join the HKPL for the 2018–19 season. This became the club's first-ever appearance in the top-flight league of Hong Kong.

In April 2019, after losing to R&F, the club was confirmed to finish at the bottom of the Hong Kong Premier League and was relegated to the Hong Kong First Division League for the next season.

Team staff

Honours
Hong Kong Second Division
Runners-up (1): 2016–17
Hong Kong Third Division
Champions (1): 2015–16

References

External links
Hoi King at HKFA

Football clubs in Hong Kong
Association football clubs established in 2015
2015 establishments in Hong Kong
Hong Kong First Division League